Xue Ying (died 282), courtesy name Daoyan, was a Chinese historian, poet, and politician of the state of Eastern Wu during the Three Kingdoms period (220–280) of China. After the fall of Wu, he continued serving under the Jin dynasty (266–420). His ancestral home was in Zhuyi County (竹邑縣), Pei Commandery (沛郡), which is around present-day Suzhou, Anhui. He was the second son of Xue Zong, a notable official and scholar of Eastern Wu.

Service under Wu

Service under Sun Xiu
After Sun Xiu ascended the throne, he appointed Yu Si, He Shao, Wang Fan and Xue Ying as Central Regular Mounted Attendants (散騎中常侍). After a few years, Xue Ying resigned his positions due to illness.

Service under Sun Hao
Early in Sun Hao's reign, he assigned Xue Ying as Left Upholder of the Law (左執法). After an unknown period of time, Xue Ying's position was changed to Master of Writing in the Selection Bureau (選曹尚書). After Sun Hao instated his son Sun Jin as crown prince in February or March 269, Xue Ying was made Junior Tutor of the Crown Prince (太子少傅), a position he held in addition to Master of Writing in the Selection Bureau.

When Sun Hao surrendered to the Jin army in 280, Xue Ying helped Sun Hao to draft the surrender documents.

Service under Jin
After Sun Hao's surrender, Xue Ying went to Luoyang. In an audience with Sima Yan (Emperor Wu), the emperor calmly asked Xue Ying, "Why did Sun Hao lose his kingdom?" Xue Ying replied, "When ruling Wu, Sun Hao was close to xiaoren and added punishments indiscriminately. He had no trusted officials or generals and everyone lived in fear. That is how he lost his kingdom." Sima Yan then continued asking about the abilities of the Wu officials who survived the invasion; Xue Ying was able to answer truthfully.

See also
 Lists of people of the Three Kingdoms

References

 Chen, Shou (3rd century). Records of the Three Kingdoms (Sanguozhi).
 Pei, Songzhi (5th century). Annotations to Records of the Three Kingdoms (Sanguozhi zhu).

Year of birth unknown
282 deaths
3rd-century Chinese historians
Eastern Wu historians
Eastern Wu poets
Eastern Wu politicians
Jin dynasty (266–420) politicians